Jully may refer to:

People
 Ange Laurent Lalive de Jully (1725–1779), French financier and patron of arts
 Humbeline of Jully (1091–1136), French nun
 Jully Black (born 1977), Canadian singer-songwriter, producer and actress
 Jully Luciano da Silva (born 1999), Brazilian footballer
 Jully Makini (born 1953), Solomon Islands poet, writer and women's rights activist
 Princess Jully, Kenyan musician

Places
 Château de Jully, France
 Jully, Yonne, France
 Jully-lès-Buxy, Saône-et-Loire, France
 Jully-sur-Sarce, Aube, France

See also
 Julie (given name)